SBS Transit Limited (SBST or just SBS) is a multi-modal public transport operator in Singapore operating bus and rail services. With a majority of its shares owned by Singaporean multinational transport conglomerate ComfortDelGro Corporation at 75%, it was formerly known as Singapore Bus Services before rebranding to SBS Transit on 1 November 2001.

It is the largest public bus operator in Singapore, as well as one of the two major operators of Singapore's rail services along with SMRT Corporation.

History

Singapore Bus Services (1973-2001)
Singapore Bus Services (SBS) was established on 1 July 1973 when the regional bus companies Amalgamated Bus Company, Associated Bus Services and United Bus Company (which were in turn results of amalgamations of privately run Chinese bus companies of the 1960s in 1971) agreed to merge their operations with each taking shareholdings of 53%, 19% and 28% respectively in the new company. The government-sanctioned merger was undertaken to improve service standards of the bus transport system. On 26 June 1978, SBS was listed on the Stock Exchange of Singapore (SES) as Singapore Bus Service (1978) Limited.

Between 1995 and 2000, a series of route handovers took place between SBS and TIBS. SBS gave up its Bukit Panjang (1995), Choa Chu Kang (1999) and Bukit Batok (2000) routes to TIBS, in exchange for the Sengkang and Punggol (1999) routes from TIBS. This was done as part of SBS Transit's upcoming operation of the North East line in the north east. The Sengkang and Punggol routes were previously operated by SBS until they were transferred to TIBS in 1995.

On 12 November 1997, Singapore Bus Services (1978) Limited was renamed DelGro Corporation, with SBS restructured as a subsidiary of DelGro Corporation and listed separately on the SES.

SBS also operated taxis as SBS Taxis. SBS Taxis merged with Singapore Commuter and Singapore Airport Bus Services on 1 July 1995 to form CityCab, which remained part of DelGro Corporation.

SBS Transit (2001-present)
On 1 November 2001, Singapore Bus Services was rebranded as SBS Transit to reflect it becoming a multi-modal transport operator with the impending opening of the Sengkang LRT line and North East MRT line.

On 29 March 2003, DelGro Corporation merged with Comfort Group to form ComfortDelGro Corporation. ComfortDelGro Corporation owns 75% of the shares in SBS Transit.

On 20 June 2003, SBS Transit commenced operating the North East MRT line, followed by the Downtown MRT line on 22 December 2013.

Buses

Routes
Until the introduction of the Bus Contracting Model (BCM), SBS Transit operated the majority of routes in almost all areas of Singapore, with the notable exception of the North and Northwest areas, where bus services were mainly run by SMRT Buses. However, with the introduction of the BCM, some SBS Transit bus services were taken over by Tower Transit Singapore (Bulim Bus Package) and Go-Ahead Singapore (Loyang Bus Package). As of June 2022, there are 218 wheelchair-accessible bus services that SBS Transit operates.

SBS Transit later became the first local operator to win a tender under the BCM in April 2017, and began operating the Seletar Bus Package on 18 March 2018. It was announced in 2018 by LTA that SBS Transit had won the subsequent package, the Bukit Merah Bus Package.

On 29 May 2021, Service 974 was handed over to SBS Transit from Tower Transit, making it the operator's first and only 9xx route & the operator's return to daily service in Choa Chu Kang ever since it handed over to TIBS (now SMRT) in 1999.

Fleet

As at December 2019, SBS Transit operated more than 3,500 buses.

SBS Transit operates a mix of single decker, double decker and articulated buses.

Single deckers

BYD K9 (Gemilang Coachworks)
Linkker LM312
MAN NL323F Lion's City (A22) (Gemilang Coachworks)
Mercedes-Benz O530 Citaro (EvoBus)
Scania K230UB (Gemilang Coachworks)
Volvo B5LH (MCV Evora)
Volvo B7RLE (Soon Chow) – used for driver training purposes

Double deckers
Alexander Dennis Enviro500
BYD K9RC (Gemilang Coachworks)
MAN ND323F Lion's City (A95) (Gemilang Coachworks)
Scania K310UD (Gemilang Coachworks) – used for driver training purposes
Volvo B9TL (Gemilang Coachworks) – used for driver training purposes
Volvo B9TL (PSV / ComfortDelGro Engineering)
Volvo B9TL (Wright Eclipse Gemini II)

Articulated buses

MAN NG363F Lion's City (A24) (Gemilang Coachworks)

When SBS was first formed in 1973, it inherited a wide variety of buses of various makes from its Chinese predecessors. Examples of such buses included the Albion Viking VK, Mercedes-Benz LP1113 and OF1413 and Nissan Diesel RX102K3 with small numbers of Ford R192 and 226, Seddon, Fargo-Kew, Bedford and Austin. Most of these buses were bodied by local coachbuilder Soon Chow although some were bodied by other companies such as Supreme Star and Strachan. Subsequent models that were purchased by SBS included Berliet and Guy Victory in the 1970s and the Volvo B57 and Mercedes-Benz OF1417 in the 1980s, the latter which were bodied by foreign coachbuilders like New Zealand Motor Bodies and Hawke Coachwork.

In 1976, SBS purchased its first 20 Leyland Atlantean AN68 buses to evaluate the suitability of double-decker bus operation, with the buses first entering service on 13 June 1977. Following the success of the trial, SBS ordered another 500 Leyland Atlantean AN68 buses from 1978 up to 1984, all of which were either bodied by Metal Sections or Walter Alexander Coachbuilders; SBS also conducted comparative trials of double-decker buses of other makes, namely the Leyland Olympian, Volvo Ailsa B55, Scania BR112DH, Dennis Dominator, Dennis Trident 3, Mercedes-Benz O305 and Volvo B10MD Citybus. In 1984, SBS purchased another 200 Leyland Olympian and 200 Mercedes-Benz O305 double-decker buses. SBS also conducted an evaluation of air conditioned buses (namely the ex-Singapore Airport Bus Services Mercedes-Benz OF1413 coaches) that year and conducted similar trials with other bus models like the Nissan Diesel U31S and Renault PR100 before its first bulk order for 50 Scania N113CRB buses in 1989.

In the 1990s, some bus makes on the roads included the Volvo B10M, Scania N113CRB, Mercedes-Benz O405, Leyland and Volvo Olympian and Dennis Dart. SBS also conducted trials of high capacity single decker buses, namely a superlong Volvo B10M Mark IV, an articulated Volvo B10MA and an articulated Mercedes-Benz O405G, in 1996 although the trial did not succeed. The first low-floor bus, a Volgren-bodied Volvo B10TL demonstrator was brought to SBS by Volvo Buses for trial purposes in 1999. After its successful trial, 51 Volvo B10TL chassis were further brought in by SBS Transit. 50 buses are bodied by Volgren between 2002 and 2003 while 1 remaining chassis is being reserved for a ComfortDelGro Engineering bodywork, which entered revenue service by 2005. The first wheelchair-accessible bus was also brought into service in 2006. SBS Transit CNG buses began service in 2002. Hybrid and electric buses came into foray since 2019, although small-scale trials began in 2010.

In 2020 to 2021, a unit of Mercedes-Benz Citaro C2 Hybrid, SG4004B, was brought in for trial purposes and was loaned from Daimler South East Asia under a Special Purpose License. The bus was on revenue service from 9 March 2020 to 8 March 2021 on 93 & 272 with SBS Transit under the Ulu Pandan Depot.

All single-decker Volvo B10BLE CNG buses were retired in 2019 except for the first two units which had been preserved, after that, both Volvo B10TLs and Volvo B9TL CDGEs were retired early and scrapped. Only 20 Volvo B9TL CDGE buses remained in operation.

Interchanges & Terminals
SBS Transit is the anchor operator for 32 locations, Ang Mo Kio, Bedok, Bishan, Boon Lay, Buona Vista, Bukit Merah, Changi Airport, Changi Biz Park, Changi Village, Clementi, Compassvale, Eunos, Ghim Moh, HarbourFront, Hougang, Joo Koon, Kampong Bahru, Kent Ridge, Marina Centre, Queen Street, Sengkang, Serangoon, Shenton Way, St. Michael's, Sims Place, Tampines, Tampines Concourse, Tampines North, Toa Payoh, Tuas, Upper East Coast & Yio Chu Kang. 

SBS Transit is the non-anchor operator for 12 locations, Beach Station (Sentosa), Bukit Batok, JB Sentral (Malaysia), Jurong East, Larkin (Malaysia), Lorong 1 Geylang, Pasir Ris, Punggol, Resorts World Sentosa, Sembawang, Woodlands & Yishun.

Depots
SBS Transit operates Ang Mo Kio, Bedok North, Bukit Batok, Hougang, Seletar, Soon Lee and Ulu Pandan bus depots. Some of the latest additions were also used for Bus Service Enhancement Programme since 17 September 2012.

Mass Rapid Transit/MRT

SBS Transit manages two of Singapore's six MRT lines in the network, the North East Line (NEL) since its opening on 20 June 2003 and the Downtown Line (DTL) since its opening on 22 December 2013.

The NEL currently has 19.2 km and 16 stations, running from HarbourFront in the south-west to Punggol in the north-east. The NEL used a fleet composed of two very similar series of 43 Alstom Metropolis train-sets, dubbed C751A and C751C by SBS Transit. The operating license for the NEL was awarded to SBS Transit in order to foster competition with SMRT Trains and to create multi-modal public transport companies, each specialising in their own district. SBS Transit's contract runs until 31 March 2033.

The NEL was Singapore's third metro line and the city's first automated and driverless system. It is sometimes referred to as "the first driverless heavy metro line in the world" or the "world’s first fully automated and driverless high-capacity rapid transit line" Whereas driverless metro systems have existed long before (notably the Lille Metro since 1983, the Vancouver Skytrain since 1985 and the Paris Metro Line 14 since 1998), the NEL is the first application of a fully automated and driverless metro system with heavy rail characteristics such as overhead catenary (in contrast to earlier systems using third rail) and 1,435 mm standard-gauge (in contrast to earlier systems featuring smaller rail profiles).

The DTL currently has 41.9 km and 34 stations, running from Bukit Panjang station in the north-west to Expo station in the east via the Central Area. The DTL is fully automated and driverless as well. The DTL uses a fleet of 92 Bombardier Movia C951/C951A trainsets.

Fleet of Trains

 The trains are classified as contracts unlike other countries which uses "class".

Light Rail Transit
SBS Transit also operates two LRT lines. The Sengkang LRT line and Punggol LRT line provide feeder connections in their respective towns to the two North East line stations. Both lines have a total of 29 stations, including Sengkang and Punggol stations. SBS Transit's contract runs until 31 March 2033.

Fleet

 The trains are classified as contracts unlike other countries which uses "class".

References

Further reading
Ilsa Sharp, (2005), SNP:Editions, The Journey — Singapore's Land Transport Story.

External links

Company website

Bus companies of Singapore
ComfortDelGro companies
Companies listed on the Singapore Exchange
Light Rail Transit (Singapore)
Mass Rapid Transit (Singapore)
Railway companies of Singapore
Transport companies established in 1973
Singaporean brands
Singaporean companies established in 1973